All My Lenins, is a historical 1997 comedy film by Hardi Volmer. The topics are Russian Bolsheviks' coup d'état plans, World War I and Russian Revolution (1917).

Plot 
In 1908, the young Estonian politician Aleksander Kesküla (Üllar Saaremäe) has escaped from Estonia, then part of the czarist Russian empire, to Switzerland. Kesküla is strongly concerned about the national oppression in the Russian empire. It is also the point of view of the famous Russian exile and bolshevik, Vladimir Lenin. (This role was played by Viktor Sukhorukov). Lenin believes czarist Russia to be "the prison of nations". Kesküla takes his last exams at the University of Bern. When World War I bursts into flame, Lenin views the Russian and German bourgeoisies to both have caused the war and so he begins to agitate "to end war even if Russia will be defeated."

Kesküla sees his great historical chance and intends to use Lenin's leftist radicals in forwarding the revolution of the Russian empire.  He elaborates mania grandiosa type plans in order to exterminate Russia forever and build upon the ruins of the great empire Gross-Estland (Great Estonia).  The empire would incorporate all former Finnic territories, including Saint Petersburg.  At first, he acts between Lenin and the German government to use German money to ignite revolutionary flames in Russia.  Kesküla and the German Ministry of Foreign Affairs make a deal to support Lenin financially: to pay for the brochures, leaflets and books of the Bolshevik Party. Lenin accepts German help but cannot really imagine in which he implicates himself.

The Germans place their super-spy Müller (Andrus Vaarik) as the coordinator of the project. Kesküla and Müller educate five Russian men as Lenin's counterparts (doppelgängers). They want to be sure they can replace the real Lenin any moment something happens to him, and so they insure their rear. Thus develops the philosophical concept: counterparts are funny but dangerous. They could replace you any moment that anybody notices you seem to be an inconvenient character (like real Lenin was).

Historical accuracy 
The authors (plot has written by Toomas Kall, idea elaborated by Hardi Volmer and Ott Sandrak) called their film pseudo-historical. However, the film contains numerous historical accuracies. In fall 1914, the German ambassador in Switzerland freiherr Gisbert von Romberg (Linnar Priimägi) informed his government about "an Estonian, Alexander Kesküla, who did proposal to use Lenin in our plans against Russia". German intelligence clarified about Kesküla's past and found out he had real access to the inner bolshevik circles and to Lenin himself (as in film). Moreover, Kesküla had former experience to initiate rebels in Russia with the help of the foreign hands: in 1905, in Tallinn, Tartu and Riga he got money from Japanese spy Motohirto Akashi and acted in his interests.

First German reaction to Kesküla's proposal was sceptical: for the experts of German Foreign Ministry the bolsheviks were quite marginal party and they had no power to change the moods and minds in Russian state (as in film). But the situation changed soon. In December 1914 Kesküla received 10 000 Reichsmarks from Germans with approval to spread it for the bolshevik's needs. From this period has remained an interesting characteristics to Kesküla: "He was a real Estonian patriot and hoped that revolution-enervated Russia leaves from his homeland and gives her independence."

Although Kesküla informed the German government about Lenin, the most intense and organized setting on revolution in Russia happened with leading of Jewish businessman and politician Alexander Parvus who operated with millions of Reichsmarks of the German money. All My Lenins does not even mention Parvus and make Aleksander Kesküla the only Lenin-educating hero. "The school of Lenin's doppelgängers in Zürich" is also masterminded fiction. There were never Lenin-Monk, Lenin-Beggar, Lenin-Electrician and Lenin-Criminal.

Reaction and critics 
All My Lenins was made by Faama Film company in cooperation with Lenfilm.

Cast

References

External links
"Minu Leninid" in the home page of Estonian Television.
 

Estonian comedy films
Films about communism
Cultural depictions of Vladimir Lenin